John M. (Jack) Sharp, Jr. is Dave P. Carlton Professor of Geology at The University of Texas at Austin. He was the president of the Geological Society of America from June 2007 to June 2008.

He received a B. Geol. E. with distinction from the University of Minnesota in 1967, a M.S. in geology from Midwestern State University, and a PhD in geology from the University of Illinois in 1974. After teaching at the University of Missouri from 1974 to 1982, he joined the University of Texas faculty, where he was Gulf Foundation Centennial Professor of Geology and C. E. Yager Professor of Geology from 1989 to 1993, Centennial Professor of Geology from 1993 to 2002, and Dave P. Carlton Professor from 2002 on.

His research deals with flow in fractured rocks, the hydrology of arid zones, and the effects of urbanization. He is particularly concerned with the hydrogeology of sedimentary basins, and with ore deposit formation.

He was from 1995 to 2002 the editor of Environmental and Engineering Geoscience.

References

External links
 Official home page

Year of birth missing (living people)
Living people
University of Minnesota College of Science and Engineering alumni
University of Illinois alumni
University of Missouri faculty
University of Texas at Austin faculty
American geologists
Presidents of the Geological Society of America